The 2022–23 season wwill be  the 111th season in the existence of FC Viktoria Plzeň and the club's 30th consecutive season in the top flight of Czech football. In addition to the domestic league, Viktoria Plzeň participated in this season's editions of the Czech Cup and the UEFA Champions League.

Players

First-team squad
.

Out on loan

Pre-season and friendlies

Competitions

Overall record

Czech First League

League table

Results summary

Results by round

Matches

Czech Cup

UEFA Champions League

References

FC Viktoria Plzeň seasons
Viktoria Plzen
2022–23 UEFA Champions League participants seasons
Czech Republic football championship-winning seasons